("judicial police") may refer to:

 The  of France, overseen by the Direction centrale de la Police judiciaire (Central Directorate of the Judicial Police)
 The  – division in Paris
 The  of Luxembourg, overseen by the 
 The  of Belgium